Scarus fuscopurpureus, common name purple-brown parrotfish, is a species of marine ray-finned fish, a parrotfish in the family Scaridae. It occurs in the western Indian Ocean and the Red Sea.

Distribution and habitat
This reef-associated species inhabits shallow water, at a depth of 2–20 m, often over sand with coral heads. It rather common and it is listed as Least Concern on the IUCN Red List. These fishes can be found in the Red Sea, the Gulf of Aden, and the Persian Gulf  (in Bahrain, Djibouti, Egypt, Eritrea, Yemen, Israel, Jordan, Iran, Qatar, United Arab Emirates, Oman, Saudi Arabia, Somalia and Sudan).

Description
Colors of these fishes depend on sexes and stage of growth. They vary from brown to green or blue, with one whitish vertical band and pale edged scales. Initial stages show light and purple brown (hence the common name) bands, with reddish edges of scales and a truncate to emarginated caudal fin. The males of the terminal phase may have a yellow band below the soft dorsal and a yellow edged lunate tail.

Biology
Scarus fuscopurpureus is oviparous and the male and female form pairs for spawning. They can be usually found in pairs or small groups. They mainly feed on algae.

Human usage
Scarus fuscopurpureus was not found in surveys of fish markets in Oman.

Naming
Scarus fuscopurpureus was first formally described as Pseudoscarus forskalii fuscopurpureus in 1871 by the German physician and zoologist Carl Benjamin Klunzinger (1834-1914) with the type locality given as Al-Qusair, Red Sea Governorate, Egypt.

Bibliography
Fenner, Robert M.: The Conscientious Marine Aquarist. Neptune City, USA: T.F.H. Publications, 2001.
Helfman, G., B. Collette y D. Facey: The diversity of fishes. Blackwell Science, Malden, Massachusetts, USA, 1997.
Hoese, D.F. 1986. A M.M. Smith y P.C. Heemstra (eds.) Smiths' sea fishes. Springer-Verlag, Berlín, Germany.
Maugé, L.A. 1986. A J. Daget, J.-P. Gosse y D.F.E. Thys van den Audenaerde (eds.) Check-list of the freshwater fishes of Africa (CLOFFA). ISNB Brusxelles; MRAC, Tervuren, Flandes; y ORSTOM, París, France. Vol. 2.
Moyle, P. y J. Cech.: Fishes: An Introduction to Ichthyology, 4th. Ed., Upper Saddle River, USA: Prentice-Hall. (2000).
Nelson, J.: Fishes of the World, 3rd. ed. New York: John Wiley and Sons. (1994).
Wheeler, A.: The World Encyclopedia of Fishes, 2nd. Ed. London: Macdonald. (1985).

References

External links

 Saltcorner
 My Reef Guide
 

fuscopurpureus
Taxa named by Carl Benjamin Klunzinger
Fish described in 1871